Freeman Catholic College is an independent Roman Catholic co-educational secondary school located in Bonnyrigg Heights, a western suburb of Sydney, New South Wales, Australia.

The school was founded in 1985 and named after Cardinal Sir James Freeman, the sixth Roman Catholic Archbishop of Sydney. The college has a student population of approximately 1,250, with an average of 250 students in each grade from 7-10 and 200 in each grade from 11-12.

Overview 
Freeman students are placed into Pastoral Houses, each representing a significant person within the community. The Houses are: 
  Cabrogal — 'Cobras', orange
  Chisholm — 'Chiefs', blue
  Gilroy — 'Gladiators', yellow
  Langtry — 'Leprechauns', purple
  Lyons — 'Leopards', grey
  Mackillop — 'Redbacks', red
  Polding — 'Pirates', green
  Turner — 'Tigers', white

The Houses compete in numerous activities and competitions throughout the year such as the Swimming Carnival, Athletics Carnival, Cross Country and MISA. The House that accumulates the most points at the end of the year becomes House Champions.

Notable people 

In 2010, Guy Zangari, who was the school's Pastoral Care Coordinator, was selected as the Australian Labor Party candidate for the state electorate of Fairfield for the New South Wales State elections in March 2011 as Joe Tripodi's replacement who had recently resigned.

See also

 List of Catholic schools in New South Wales
 Catholic education in Australia

References

External links
 Freeman Catholic College

Catholic secondary schools in Sydney
1985 establishments in Australia
City of Fairfield
Educational institutions established in 1985